The spotted sand lizard (Meroles suborbitalis) is a species of lizard found in South Africa, Namibia and Botswana.

References

Reptiles described in 1854
Meroles
Taxa named by Wilhelm Peters